Iain Murray Rose,  (6 January 1939 – 15 April 2012) was an Australian swimmer, actor, sports commentator and marketing executive. He was a six-time Olympic medalist (four gold, one silver, one bronze), and at one time held the world records in the 400-metre, 800-metre, and 1500-metre freestyle (long course). He made his Olympic debut at the 1956 Summer Olympics as a 17-year-old and won three Olympic medals, all gold. Four years later, as a 21-year-old, he won three Olympic medals (one gold, one silver, one bronze) at the 1960 Summer Olympics.

Biography

Early life
Iain Murray Rose was born on 6 January 1939 in Birmingham, England to parents Eileen and Ian Rose. As World War II broke out, his family moved to Australia in 1940 when he was a baby. He started swimming as a boy and attended Cranbrook School in Bellevue Hill, Sydney. He swam regularly at Redleaf Pool, an enclosed saltwater swimming pool in the suburb of Double Bay. In 2012, the pool was renamed Murray Rose Pool in his honour.

Career
At the age of 17, Rose participated in the 1956 Summer Olympics in Melbourne. He won the 400-metre and 1500-metre freestyle races and was a member of the winning team in the 4×200-metre freestyle relay. Winning three gold medals in his home country immediately made him a national hero. He was the youngest Olympian to be awarded three gold medals in one Olympic Games. Afterwards, Rose moved to the United States to accept an athletic scholarship at the University of Southern California (USC) where he received a Bachelor of Arts degree in Business/Communications.

He continued competing while at USC, and graduated in 1962. At the 1960 Summer Olympics in Rome, Italy, Rose again won an Olympic gold medal in the 400m freestyle, as well as a silver in the 1500m freestyle and a bronze in the  freestyle relay, bringing his haul to six Olympic medals. In addition to his Olympic medals, he won four gold medals at the 1962 Commonwealth Games in Perth, Western Australia. He eventually set 15 world records, including the world record in the 800-metre freestyle in 1962, which was not broken until Semyon Belits-Geiman set a new record in 1966. Rose continued to compete as a masters swimmer. During the 1960s, he also pursued an acting career, starring in two Hollywood films and making guest appearances on television shows.

In addition, Rose worked as an Australian sports commentator for the Nine Network, plus each of the major US networks, participating in seven consecutive Olympic Games.

From 1988 to 1994, Rose was vice-president of California Sports Marketing specialising in marketing, sponsorships and promotions for the Los Angeles Lakers basketball team and special events at the Great Western Forum.

He returned to Sydney with his family in 1994 and worked as a Senior Account Director for Sports Marketing and Management – the official marketing agent for the Australian Olympic Committee, the Australian Commonwealth Games Association and a range of other leading Australian sports organisations.

An avenue at Sydney Olympic Park was named for him in 2000. He was one of the eight flag-bearers of the Olympic Flag at the 2000 Summer Olympics opening ceremony in Sydney.

In 2010, Rose led a team on a pilgrimage for Military History Tours to Gallipoli and a 4.5 km swim from Europe to Asia across the Dardanelles.

In 2012, Redleaf Pool in Double Bay, Sydney, was officially renamed Murray Rose Pool in his honour. In 2022 Cranbrook School named its new swimming complex on New South Head Road the Murray Rose Aquatic & Fitness Centre.

Work in film and television
In 1958 he appeared on You Bet Your Life where he was baffled by the world geography questions. On 6 January 1959, Rose appeared as a guest challenger on the TV panel show To Tell the Truth.

He made his acting debut in the 1962 Australian live drama My Three Angels.

Later he starred in the 1964 surf movie Ride the Wild Surf and in Ice Station Zebra in 1968. He also made periodic appearances in television and film including guest spots on Dr Kildare, You Bet Your Life, The Patty Duke Show, Dream Rider, Time Capsule 1932 and Time Capsule 1938.

Charity
Rose held a number of cause-related Board positions including the Mary MacKillop Foundation and Patron of Rainbow Club Australia, a non-profit charity providing children with special needs the opportunity to explore their abilities through sporting and recreational activities. In 2012, Rainbow Club Australia renamed their annual event, The Murray Rose's Malabar Magic Ocean Swim. The MRMM offers a two swim program of 1 km and 2.4 km

Honours
Rose was appointed a Member of the Order of Australia (AM) in 2000 for services to swimming. He also received the Australian Sports Medal that year and, in 2001, he was awarded the Centenary Medal.

Books
Murray Rose's father, Ian F Rose, published Faith, Love, and Seaweed about his son's childhood and diet.
In 2013, Murray Rose's memoir Life is Worth Swimming was posthumously published. Written before his leukaemia diagnosis, Life is Worth Swimming reflects on Rose's life and experiences as an Olympic swimmer.

Personal life
Rose married ballerina Jodi Wintz on 20 October 1988. Their son was born in 1990. He was previously married to Bobbie Whitby and he adopted her daughter.

Rose was a strict vegetarian in his swimming days – this earned him the nickname "The Seaweed Streak" – but he later added meat to his diet.

Rose died of leukaemia on 15 April 2012 at the age of 73 in Sydney, New South Wales.

Filmography

See also
 List of members of the International Swimming Hall of Fame
 List of Commonwealth Games medallists in swimming (men)
 List of Olympic medalists in swimming (men)
 World record progression 400 metres freestyle
 World record progression 800 metres freestyle
 World record progression 1500 metres freestyle
 World record progression 4 × 200 metres freestyle relay

References

1939 births
2012 deaths
Australian male freestyle swimmers
Olympic swimmers of Australia
Olympic bronze medalists in swimming
Swimmers at the 1956 Summer Olympics
Swimmers at the 1960 Summer Olympics
Olympic silver medalists for Australia
Olympic bronze medalists for Australia
World record setters in swimming
USC Trojans men's swimmers
Members of the Order of Australia
Recipients of the Centenary Medal
Recipients of the Australian Sports Medal
University of Southern California alumni
Australian male actors
English emigrants to Australia
Sportspeople from Birmingham, West Midlands
Swimmers from Sydney
People educated at Cranbrook School, Sydney
Deaths from leukemia
Deaths from cancer in New South Wales
Medalists at the 1960 Summer Olympics
Medalists at the 1956 Summer Olympics
Olympic gold medalists for Australia
Olympic gold medalists in swimming
Olympic silver medalists in swimming
Swimmers at the 1962 British Empire and Commonwealth Games
Commonwealth Games medallists in swimming
Commonwealth Games gold medallists for Australia
Sport Australia Hall of Fame inductees
20th-century Australian people
Australian expatriates in the United States
Sportsmen from New South Wales
Medallists at the 1962 British Empire and Commonwealth Games